Caloptilia bipunctata is a moth of the family Gracillariidae. It is known from Japan (Honshū).

The wingspan is 10.2-11.5 mm.

The larvae feed on Neolitsea sericea. They mine the leaves of their host plant.

References

bipunctata
Moths described in 1982
Moths of Japan